Lori Ann Lethin (born August 4, 1955) is an American retired actress, known for her appearances on television and in several horror films in the 1980s.

Biography
Lethin was born August 4, 1955 in Los Angeles to Paul Lethin. She made her feature debut in the slasher film The Prey, filmed around 1980 but released in 1983. She subsequently had a lead role in Bloody Birthday (1981) opposite Susan Strasberg, about a group of children who begin committing murders. On July 19, 1981, Lethin married actor Loring Pickering in Catalina Island.

Lethin starred as Charlene Matlock in the 1986 Matlock pilot film, Diary of a Perfect Murder. She was replaced by Linda Purl in the subsequent series. She later starred in the comedy horror film Return to Horror High (1987), playing multiple roles. Lethin had a minor role in Jonathan Kaplan's 1999 drama Brokedown Palace, playing the mother of Kate Beckinsale's character.

Filmography

Film

Television

References

External links

1955 births
Actresses from Los Angeles
American film actresses
American television actresses
Living people
21st-century American women